The Green Sparrow is the second solo album from Phish bassist Mike Gordon, released August 5, 2008. It is his first solo album in five years (since 2003's Inside In). Gordon has also released a pair of studio albums with acoustic guitarist Leo Kottke, a live album with the experimental Benevento-Russo Duo, and a live DVD with Grateful Dead offshoot Rhythm Devils.

Gordon dedicated all of 2007 to writing The Green Sparrow while taking a yearlong hiatus from touring. It was recorded at the end of 2007 and into 2008 in his home recording studio in Vermont and features guest appearances from Bill Kreutzmann, Trey Anastasio, Chuck Leavell, Page McConnell, Ivan Neville and others. A 2008 Summer Tour to support the album began in July 2008 and stretched into September with Gordon backed by Max Creek guitarist Scott Murawski, keyboardist Tom Cleary, drummer Todd Isler, and percussionist Craig Myers. As of 2018, only Murawski and Myers remain from Gordon's original 2003 touring band.

Track listing
 "Another Door" – 3:40
 "Voices" – 5:20
 "Dig Further Down" – 4:01
 "Pretend" – 4:09
 "Traveled Too Far" – 4:33
 "Andelmans' Yard" – 6:13
 "Morphing Again" – 3:38
 "Radar Blip" – 5:05
 "Jaded" – 3:08
 "Sound" – 4:38

All songs written by Mike Gordon

Bonus tracks
 "Doing It Anyway" (at iTunes)
 "Be Careful What You Wish For" (at Rhapsody)

Personnel

Musicians
Mike Gordon – vocals, bass, guitar, keyboards, hi-hat, tambourine, drum programming, piano, Clucky
Trey Anastasio – guitar
Doug Belote – drums, cowbell, shaker, V-Drums
Russ Lawton – drums
Ivan Neville – organ
Page McConnell – organ
 Nadine LaFond – vocals
 Jared Slomoff – vocals, cowbell
 Joe Russo – drums
 Chuck Leavell – organ
 Steve Ferraris – bongos, Danmo, cowbell
 Bill Kreutzmann – drums
 Scott Murawski – acoustic guitar
 Ken Lovelett – tambourine
 Aaron Johnson – trombone
 Jordan McLean – trumpet
 Cochemea Gastelum – saxophone
 Julee Avallone – flute
 Marie Claire – vocals

Production
 Produced by Mike Gordon, John Siket, Jared Slomoff
 Recorded and Mixed by John Siket
 Mastered by Fred Kevorkian
 Cover Illustration/Hand-Lettering by Mike Gordon
 Design/Layout by Julia Mordaunt

References

External links
Official Green Sparrow Order
Mike Gordon's official site

Mike Gordon albums
2008 albums
Rounder Records albums